Șerbăuți is a commune located in Suceava County, Bukovina, northeastern Romania. It is composed of two villages, namely Călinești and Șerbăuți.

References 

Communes in Suceava County
Localities in Southern Bukovina
Duchy of Bukovina